The Colorado High School Activities Association (CHSAA) is the governing body for all high school activities throughout the state of Colorado.  It was founded in 1921, and as of the 2019–20 school year has a membership of 360 full-time high schools, plus more than 50 middle and junior high schools, for a total of more than 400 schools.  The Association hold championships for 29 different sports for both boys and girls, plus competitions in music, sportsmanship, student council, and spirit.

Sports

Source: CHSAA website

Fall
 Boys cross country
 Girls cross country
 Field hockey
 (American) Football
 Boys golf
 Gymnastics
 Boys soccer
 Softball
 Spirit
 Boys tennis
 Girls volleyball

Winter
 Boys basketball
 Girls basketball
 Ice hockey
 Skiing
 Girls swimming
 Boys wrestling
 Girls wrestling

Spring
 Baseball
 Girls golf
 Boys lacrosse
 Girls lacrosse
 Girls soccer
 Boys swimming
 Girls tennis
 Boys track
 Girls track
 Boys volleyball

Activities
 Music
 Speech and Debate
 Sportsmanship
 Student leadership

CHSAANow.com
CHSAA's website covers the organization's athletics and activities. In addition to game coverage and features, the site also produces weekly rankings during the regular season, as well as All-State teams.

References

External links
CHSAANow
Colorado High School Activities Association

Education in Colorado
High school sports in Colorado
Sports organizations established in 1921
High school sports associations in the United States
1921 establishments in Colorado